Waxxari is a town in Ruoqiang / Qakilik County, Bayingolin Mongol Autonomous Prefecture, Xinjiang, China.


Name
'Waxxari' means 'noisy city' in Uyghur. The Mandarin Chinese pinyin-derived name Washixia (Wade-Giles: Wa-shih-hsia) is derived from the sound of the Uyghur name, an abbreviation of Washixiehai'er.

History
In 1953, Waxxari Township was established.

In 1960, Waxxari Township became Waxxari Commune.

In 1984, Waxxari Commune became Waxxari Township.

In 2012, Waxxari Township became Waxxari Town.

Geography
Waxxari is located on the Waxxari River (Waxxari He, Wa-shih-hsia Ho).

Administrative divisions
Waxxari includes one residential community and five villages:

Residential community:
 Waxxari (Washixia)

Villages:
Wudulewusitang, Wutamu (Wutamucun) , Xinjian, Muye, Tashisayi

Demographics

, the population of Waxxari was 43.9% Uyghur and 43.2% Han Chinese.

Transportation
China National Highway 315

Historical maps

Notes

References

Populated places in Xinjiang
Township-level divisions of Xinjiang